Nazirpur refers to a Census Town in Nadia district, West Bengal, India

It also refers to:
Nazirpur Upazila, an upazila in Pirojpur District, Barisal Division, Bangladesh	 
Nazirpur, Malda, a census town in Malda district, West Bengal, India